Mary R. McKie was a Canadian artist known for her watercolor paintings. Based in Halifax, Nova Scotia, McKie was active as an artist from 1840 to 1862.

Her work is included in the collections of the Musée national des beaux-arts du Québec and the National Library and Archives of Canada.

References

Artists from Nova Scotia
People from Halifax, Nova Scotia
Date of birth unknown
Date of death unknown
19th-century Canadian women artists